South Korea, as Korea, competed at the 1964 Summer Olympics in Tokyo, Japan. 154 competitors, 128 men and 26 women, took part in 93 events in 17 sports.

Medals

Athletics

Basketball

Boxing

Cycling

Six cyclists represented South Korea in 1964.

Individual road race
 Lee Seon-bae
 An Byeong-hun
 Hwang Chang-sik
 Wi Gyeong-yong

Team time trial
 An Byeong-hun
 Jo Seong-hwan
 Hong Seong-ik
 Lee Seon-bae

Diving

Equestrian

Fencing

Five fencers, four men and one woman, represented South Korea in 1964.

Men's foil
 Sin Du-ho
 Kim Man-sig
 Han Myeong-seok

Men's team foil
 Sin Du-ho, Han Myeong-seok, Kim Man-sig, Kim Chang-hwan

Men's épée
 Sin Du-ho
 Han Myeong-seok
 Kim Man-sig

Men's team épée
 Sin Du-ho, Kim Chang-hwan, Han Myeong-seok, Kim Man-sig

Women's foil
 Sin Gwang-suk

Football

Gymnastics

Judo

Modern pentathlon

One male pentathlete represented South Korea in 1964.

Individual competition
 Choi Gwi-seung — 2809 points (37th place)

Rowing

Shooting

Ten shooters represented South Korea in 1964.
Open

Swimming

Volleyball

Men's Team Competition
 Round Robin
 Lost to Japan (0-3)
 Lost to United States (2-3) 
 Lost to Soviet Union (0-3)
 Lost to Brazil (1-3) 
 Lost to Romania (2-3) 
 Lost to Netherlands (1-3)
 Lost to Bulgaria (1-3)
 Lost to Hungary (2-3)
 Lost to Czechoslovakia (0-3) → Tenth place

 Team Roster
 Kim In-soo
 Oh Pyong-kil
 Sohn Young-wan
 Chung Sun-hung
 Park Suh-kwang
 Suh Ban-suk
 Lee Kyu-soh
 Kim Young-joon
 Kim Sung-kil
 Kim Kwang-soo
 Kim Jin-hee
 Lim Tae-hoh

Women's Team Competition
 Round Robin
 Lost to Soviet Union (0-3)
 Lost to Poland (0-3)
 Lost to Japan (0-3)
 Lost to Romania (0-3)
 Lost to United States (0-3) → Sixth and last place

 Team Roster
 Suh Choon-kang
 Moon Kyung-sook
 Ryoo Choon-ja
 Kim Kil-ja
 Oh Soon-ok
 Chung Jong-uen
 Choi Don-hi
 Hong Nam-sun
 Oh Chung-ja
 Yoon Jung-sook
 Kwak Ryong-ja
 Lee Keun-soo

Weightlifting

Wrestling

References

External links
 Official Olympic Reports
 International Olympic Committee results database

Korea, South
1964
1964 in South Korean sport